Ilias Tsirimokos (26 April 1907 – 13 July 1968) was a Greek politician who served as Prime Minister of Greece for a very brief period (from 20 August 1965 to 17 September 1965).

Life
He was born in Lamia in 1907. His father, Ioannis Tsirimokos, was also of a political background. Tsirimokos got involved in politics from a young age and was first elected to parliament in 1936 on the Liberal Party's ticket. During the Axis Occupation of Greece, he co-founded a small leftist party, the Union of People's Democracy (ELD). He served as its general secretary, while the distinguished law professor Alexandros Svolos served as its president. In 1941, ELD joined the National Liberation Front (EAM), and Tsirimokos gained a seat in EAM's central committee. In 1944, Tsirimokos was appointed as Secretary for Justice in the EAM-controlled Political Committee of National Liberation. However he resigned from that position on 2 December 1944 alongside 3 other left-wing cabinet members after pressure from the British Government.

In the 1950 elections, after the Greek Civil War, Tsirimokos was elected again into parliament, for Athens, on behalf of the renamed Socialist Party-Union of People's Democracy (SK-ELD). He was re-elected in the 1958 elections for the United Democratic Left, and again in 1961, 1963 and 1964 for the Center Union. In 1963, he was elected as Speaker of the Parliament. During the period of the "Apostasia" in the summer of 1965, Tsirimokos was chosen by King Constantine II to form a government. He failed to gain a vote of confidence, and was succeeded by Stefanos Stefanopoulos, in whose government he retained ministerial posts.

He died in Athens on 13 July 1968 at the age of 61.

References

1907 births
1968 deaths
20th-century prime ministers of Greece
People from Lamia (city)
Liberal Party (Greece) politicians
Socialist Party of Greece politicians
Democratic Alignment politicians
United Democratic Left politicians
Centre Union politicians
Apostasia of 1965
Prime Ministers of Greece
Deputy Prime Ministers of Greece
Finance ministers of Greece
Foreign ministers of Greece
Ministers of the Interior of Greece
Speakers of the Hellenic Parliament
Greek MPs 1936
Greek MPs 1950–1951
Greek MPs 1958–1961
Greek MPs 1961–1963
Greek MPs 1963–1964
Greek MPs 1964–1967
National Liberation Front (Greece) members